Ćorkovići (Ћорковићи) is populated place in  Bosnia and Herzegovina, Kotor Varoš Municipality in Republika Srpska. In 1991, in this village lived 175 inhabitants, and 2013. : 101.

Geography
Ćorkovići is situated at the steep, south-western slopes Petrovo polje (Peter's fields), at an altitude of about 910-930m. Below the village flows Ćorkovac, left tributary Vrbanja river. It is traversed by the local road connecting regional road R-440: Kotor Varoš – Obodnik – Šiprage – Kruševo Brdo communicating Skender Vakuf – Imljani – Korićani – Vitovlje – Turbe through Ilomska.

Population

References 

Populated places in Kotor Varoš
Villages in Republika Srpska